The Bainbridge Group is a geologic group in Missouri. It preserves fossils dating back to the Silurian period.

See also

 List of fossiliferous stratigraphic units in Missouri
 Paleontology in Missouri

References
 

Silurian System of North America
Geologic groups of Missouri